The Lucille Lortel Award for Outstanding Lead Actress in a Play is an award presented annually at the Lucille Lortel Awards to honor an actress for excellence in a leading role in an Off-Broadway production. The categories were split into Outstanding Lead Actress in a Play and Outstanding Lead Actress in a Musical in 2014.

Nominees and recipients

1990s

2000s

2010s

Multiple awards 
 Eileen Atkins, 2 awards for Lead Actress 
 Cherry Jones, 2 Awards for Lead Actress
 Mary-Louise Parker, 2 awards for Lead Actress

Most nominations without a win
 Jayne Houdyshell (4 nominations)
 S. Epatha Merkerson (3 nominations)
 Cristin Milioti (2 nominations) (Plus one for Lead Actress in a Musical)

See also
 Obie Award for Distinguished Performance by an Actress (Off-Broadway and Off-Off-Broadway)
 Drama Desk Award for Outstanding Featured Actress in a Play  (Broadway, Off-Broadway and Off-Off-Broadway)

References

External links 
 Lucille Lortel Award Nominees and Recipients
 Internet Off-Broadway Database - Lortel Archives

American theater awards
Off-Broadway
Culture of New York City
Awards for actresses